Tateyamaria omphalii is a Gram-negative and strictly aerobic bacterium from the genus of Tateyamaria which has been isolated from the shell of the sea snail Omphalius pfeifferi pfeifferi from Japan.

References 

Rhodobacteraceae
Bacteria described in 2008